Dodangeh may refer to:
 Dodangeh, Kerman
 Dodangeh District
 Dodangeh Rural District (disambiguation)

See also
 Dow Dangeh (disambiguation)